The 2022 Engie Open de l'Isère was a professional tennis tournament played on indoor hard courts. It was the twelfth edition of the tournament which was part of the 2022 ITF Women's World Tennis Tour. It took place in Grenoble, France between 7 and 13 February 2022.

Singles main-draw entrants

Seeds

 1 Rankings are as of 31 January 2022.

Other entrants
The following players received wildcards into the singles main draw:
  Carole Monnet
  Amandine Monnot
  Mallaurie Noël
  Alice Robbe

The following player received entry using a protected ranking:
  Kathinka von Deichmann

The following players received entry from the qualifying draw:
  Alicia Barnett
  Kamilla Bartone
  Alex Eala
  Anna Gabric
  Ekaterina Makarova
  Chloé Noël
  Evita Ramirez
  Margaux Rouvroy

Champions

Singles

  Katie Boulter def.  Anna Blinkova, 7–6(7–2), 6–7(6–8), 6–2

Doubles

  Yuriko Miyazaki /  Prarthana Thombare def.  Alicia Barnett /  Olivia Nicholls, 6–3, 6–3

References

External links
 2022 Engie Open de l'Isère at ITFtennis.com
 Official website

2022 ITF Women's World Tennis Tour
2022 in French tennis
February 2022 sports events in France